Oak Creek High School is a public four-year high school located in Oak Creek, Wisconsin. It is the sole high school of the Oak Creek-Franklin Joint School District, and one of the largest public schools in the state.

History 
Oak Creek High School was built in 1961 at a cost of over $3 million. The school was renovated in 2001 alongside additions. In 2012 the football stadium was enlarged and fitted with synthetic turf. In 2017 the Ninth Grade Center was completed, costing $36 million. In 2021 the Oak Creek Performing Arts Education Center was completed, alongside renovated and new career and technical education facilities.

The high school was involved in a federal lawsuit, Butler v. Oak Creek-Franklin School District, 172 F.Supp.2d 1102, involving the school's athletic code. The case involved claims for violation of constitutional due process and state constitutional rights arising from suspension of a high school student.

Assistant Principal Kimberly Leannais kept her job following her 3rd OWI in 2017.

Michael Jossie, a former special education teacher and basketball coach, pleaded guilty of second degree sexual assault of a child (under 16 years of age). Jossie was caught by cleaning staff engaging in sexual activity with a female student after school.

Athletics

Oak Creek High School offers the following sports:

Boys' football
Boys' cross country
Boys' soccer
Boys' basketball
Boys' hockey
Boys' swim & dive
Boys' wrestling
Boys' tennis
Boys' track and field
Boys' golf
Boys' volleyball
Boys' baseball
Girls' swimming and diving
Girls' tennis
Girls' cross country
Girls' volleyball
Girls' basketball
Girls' hockey
Girls' gymnastics
Girls' track & Field
Girls' soccer
Girls' softball
Pom poms
Cheerleading

OCHS won a state championship in boys' cross country in 1978.

The 1994-1995 Pom Pon squad won The Contest of Champions in Orlando, Florida.

The 2003, 2004, and 2005 Boys Baseball Team won back-to-back-to-back Summer Season Division 1 State Championships.

The Boys Track and Field Team took second place overall in division 1 in both 2017 and 2018. 

The 2013-2014 Girls Basketball Team won the title of Division 1 State Champions.

The Oak Creek Marching Knights are one of the top marching bands in the state of Wisconsin. The band won seven consecutive Class 4A state championships from 2014 to 2021(No competition held 2020).

Notable alumni 
 Travis Beckum, tight end and Super Bowl champion for the New York Giants
 Brian Calhoun, NFL running back for the Detroit Lions
 John Jagler, state legislator and former WTMJ (AM) radio personality
 John Michaels, NFL defensive/offensive lineman for the New York Jets
 John Matuszak, football player and actor
 Cathy Stepp, Wisconsin State Senate
 Gary George Wetzel, soldier and Medal of Honor recipient

References

External links 
 Oak Creek High School website

Educational institutions established in 1961
Public high schools in Wisconsin
Schools in Milwaukee County, Wisconsin
1961 establishments in Wisconsin